Serine/threonine-protein phosphatase 2A 56 kDa regulatory subunit epsilon isoform is an enzyme that in humans is encoded by the PPP2R5E gene.

Function 

The product of this gene belongs to the phosphatase 2A regulatory subunit B family. Protein phosphatase 2A is one of the four major Ser/Thr phosphatases, and it is implicated in the negative control of cell growth and division. It consists of a common heteromeric core enzyme, which is composed of a catalytic subunit and a constant regulatory subunit, that associates with a variety of regulatory subunits. The B regulatory subunit might modulate substrate selectivity and catalytic activity. This gene encodes an epsilon isoform of the regulatory subunit B56 subfamily.

Interactions 

PPP2R5E has been shown to interact with PPP2R1B and PPP2CA.

References

Further reading